In United States federal agriculture legislation, the Agricultural Act of 1970 (P.L. 91-524) initiated a significant change in commodity support policy.

This 3-year farm bill replaced some of the more restrictive and mandatory features of previous law (acreage allotments, planting restrictions, and marketing quotas) with voluntary annual cropland set-asides and marketing certificate payments to achieve parity prices (the precursor to target prices and deficiency payments).  For the first time, the law adopted an annual payment limitation per producer (set at $55,000 per crop).  Among other things, the Act also amended and extended the authority of the Class I differential in federal milk marketing order areas.

References

 

United States federal agriculture legislation
91st United States Congress
1970 in the United States
1970 in law